The 2013 Tripura Legislative Assembly election took place in a single phase on 14 February to elect the Members of the Legislative Assembly (MLA) from each of the 60 Assembly Constituencies (ACs) in Tripura, India.

Highlights
Election to the Tripura Legislative Assembly were held on 14 February 2013.  The election were held in a single phase for all the 60 assembly constituencies.

Participating Political Parties

No. of Constituencies

Electors

Performance of Women Candidates

Background
The previous elections to the 10th Tripura Legislative Assembly was held in 2008. As of 2009, of the 60 ACs in Tripura, 20 are reserved for Scheduled Tribes and 10 are reserved for Scheduled Castes. February 2013 Elections in all polling stations were held using Electronic voting machines.

The Left Front, led by Communist Party of India (Marxist), and headed by Manik Sarkar, had formed the Government in the 10th Tripura Assembly after being re-elected in 2008. The Left Front had won 46 of the 60 seats in 2008 election.

Campaign
The 2013 elections saw the Left Front trying to retain power for a fifth consecutive term.
A total of 249 candidates from different political parties contested this election.

Election Day
Election Day (14 February 2013) was overall peaceful and passed without any major incident of violence in this state that has traditionally faced insurgency from militant outfits.

According to the report by Times of India, the chief election officer of the state told that the voter turnout across the state was 93.57%, which set the record for the country's highest-ever voter turnout. This beats the previous record at 91.22 which was also set by Tripura in its 2008 assembly election. Women voters outnumbered men voters by 2.13 percent. There was 3,041 polling stations, and 18,000 poll officials were on duty.

Results

|-
!colspan=10|
|-
! style="text-align:left;" rowspan="2" colspan="2"| Parties and coalitions
! colspan="3"| Popular vote
! colspan="2"| Seats
|- 
! width="70"| Votes
! width="45"| %
! width="45"| ±pp
! width="30"| Won
! width="30"| +/−
|- style="text-align:right"
| bgcolor=""|
| align="left"| Communist Party of India (Marxist) (CPM)
| 1,059,327 || 48.11 || 0.10
| 49 || 3
|- style="text-align:right"
| width="1" bgcolor=""|
| align="left"| Indian National Congress (INC)
| 804,457 || 36.53 || 0.15
| 10 || 
|- style="text-align:right"
| bgcolor=""|
| align="left"| Communist Party of India (CPI)
| 34,500 || 1.57 || 0.09
| 1 || 
|- style="text-align:right"
| bgcolor=""|
| align="left"| Indigenous Nationalist Party of Twipra (INPT)
| 167,078 || 7.59 || 1.38
| 0 || 1
|- style="text-align:right"
| bgcolor=""|
| align="left"| Revolutionary Socialist Party (RSP)
| 31,717   || 1.95 || 0.26
| 0 || 2
|- style="text-align:right"
| bgcolor=""|
| align="left"| Bharatiya Janata Party (BJP)
| 33,808  || 1.54 || 0.05
| 0 || 
|- style="text-align:right"
| bgcolor=""|
| align="left"| Independents (IND)
| 21,126 || 0.96 || 2.28
| 0 || 
|- style="text-align:right"
| bgcolor="black"|
| align="left"| Others
| 50,052 || 1.75 || 0.25
| 0 || 
|-
| colspan="7" bgcolor="#E9E9E9"|
|-  style="text-align:right; font-weight:bold;"
| align="left" colspan="2"| Total
| 2,202,065 || 100.00 || bgcolor="#E9E9E9"|
| 60 || ±0
|-
|}

Winners by Constituency

References

2013 State Assembly elections in India
2013